Stephen Lefeaver (1791 – 26 July 1867) was an English first-class cricketer who played for Kent in the 1820s. He is recorded in two matches in 1825, totalling 9 runs with a highest score of 8, holding one catch and taking one wicket.

References

English cricketers
English cricketers of 1787 to 1825
Kent cricketers
1791 births
1867 deaths
People from Marden, Kent